The 23rd Legislative Assembly of Ontario was in session from June 2, 1948, until October 6, 1951, just prior to the 1951 general election. The majority party was the Ontario Progressive Conservative Party, however its leader, George Drew, lost his seat in the 1948 general election and soon after resigned as party leader to enter federal politics and take the leadership of the Progressive Conservative Party of Canada. He was replaced on October 19, 1948, by Thomas Laird Kennedy who served as premier and interim Progressive Conservative leader until Leslie Frost became party leader and succeeded Kennedy as premier on May 4, 1949.

The official opposition was led by Ted Jolliffe of the Co-operative Commonwealth Federation (CCF).

M.C. Davies served as speaker for the assembly.

On April 5, 1951, the Fair Employment Practices Act and the Female Employees Fair Remuneration Act were passed. The first act introduced fines and a complaint procedure to deal with discrimination based on race or religion in hiring practices. The second act was intended to ensure that female workers were paid the same wage as a male worker doing the same work for the same employer.

Members elected to the Assembly

Timeline

External links 
Members in Parliament 23

References 

Terms of the Legislative Assembly of Ontario
1948 establishments in Ontario
1951 disestablishments in Ontario